Dorothy Dittrich is a Canadian playwright and musical theatre director and composer from Vancouver, British Columbia, who won the Governor General's Award for English-language drama at the 2022 Governor General's Awards for her play The Piano Teacher: A Healing Key.

Prior to its print publication in 2022, The Piano Teacher had its theatrical premiere at Vancouver's Arts Club Theatre in 2017, and won the Jessie Richardson Theatre Award for outstanding original script that year.

Her other plays have included When We Were Singing, The Dissociates and Lesser Demons. She has also released Short Stories, an album of original piano compositions which was produced by June Millington.

She is out as lesbian, and wrote The Dissociates during a writers' residency at Buddies in Bad Times.

References

External links

20th-century Canadian composers
20th-century Canadian dramatists and playwrights
20th-century Canadian women writers
21st-century Canadian composers
21st-century Canadian dramatists and playwrights
21st-century Canadian women writers
Canadian women dramatists and playwrights
Canadian musical theatre composers
Canadian women composers
Canadian lesbian writers
Canadian lesbian musicians
Governor General's Award-winning dramatists
Canadian LGBT dramatists and playwrights
LGBT composers
Living people
Musicians from Vancouver
Writers from Vancouver
Year of birth missing (living people)
Lesbian dramatists and playwrights
21st-century Canadian LGBT people
20th-century Canadian LGBT people